Mononychellus is a genus of mites belonging to the family Tetranychidae.

The genus has almost cosmopolitan distribution.

Species:

Mononychellus bondari 
Mononychellus caribbeanae 
Mononychellus chapalensis 
Mononychellus chemosetosus 
Mononychellus erythrinae 
Mononychellus eysenhardtiae 
Mononychellus flabellosetus 
Mononychellus georgicus 
Mononychellus heteromniae 
Mononychellus hispidosetus 
Mononychellus hoffmannae 
Mononychellus hyptis 
Mononychellus lippiae 
Mononychellus manihoti 
Mononychellus mcgregori 
Mononychellus planki 
Mononychellus progresivus 
Mononychellus psidium 
Mononychellus reevesi 
Mononychellus siccus 
Mononychellus tanajoa 
Mononychellus tephrosiae 
Mononychellus tunstalli 
Mononychellus vaalensis 
Mononychellus vilaricensis 
Mononychellus virginiensis 
Mononychellus virosus 
Mononychellus wainsteini 
Mononychellus willardiae 
Mononychellus yemensis

References

Acari